Joanie Keller (born in Wayne, Nebraska) is an American country music singer. Keller began performing in her father's band when she was a small child. After graduating high school, she played local clubs in Colorado before moving to Nashville to pursue a career as a country singer.

Keller's debut album, Sparks Are Gonna Fly, was released by Broken Bow Records in April 2000. Its first single, "Three Little Teardrops", peaked at number 66 on the Billboard Hot Country Singles & Tracks chart. The album received a mixed review from Joel Bernstein of Country Standard Time, who wrote that "it's too smooth and polished to grab the hard-core honkytonkers, but it's often too country for much of today's younger audience." Carrie Attebury of about.com compared Keller favorably to Linda Davis.

Since parting ways with Broken Bow, Keller has continued to perform in Nashville with the band 45 RPM. She was inducted into the Nebraska Music Hall of Fame in 2009.

Discography

Albums

Singles

Music videos

References

American women country singers
American country singer-songwriters
BBR Music Group artists
Living people
Country musicians from Nebraska
People from Wayne, Nebraska
Year of birth missing (living people)
21st-century American women
Singer-songwriters from Nebraska